Tracy Mann (born 1957) is an Australian actress and  voice artist. After appearing in a number of television series, she won an Australian Film Institute award in 1980 for movie Hard Knocks . She has also won awards in her home country for her work in mini-series  Sword of Honour and 2005 movie comedy Hating Alison Ashley.

Early life 
Born in Adelaide, South Australia in 1957, Mann got her first big break playing Tina Harris in 1970s soap opera The Box. She is possibly best remembered to audiences for playing a character who ended up behind bars, deaf biker's moll Georgie Baxter in Prisoner. Mann played the lead role of guitarist / singer Carol Howard in the 1984 ABC-TV series Sweet and Sour, and also played the lead role in police drama Skirts (1990).

Television 
Other TV appearances include  Glenview High, The Sullivans, The Young Doctors, Arcade (she played Susie Blair, Syd Heylen and Aileen Britton's daughter), Holiday Island, Prisoner, A Country Practice, Cowra Breakout, GP, Sword of Honour, Noah and Saskia, Home and Away, Bluey, Cyclone Tracy, Good Guys Bad Guys, Col'n Carpenter, Watch This Space, The Flying Doctors, Sweet and Sour, Kingswood Country, Boys from the Bush, How Wonderful!, Janus, Spring & Fall: Out of Line, Water Rats, All Saints, Cop Shop, The Oracle, The Tromaville Cafe, Skyways, Ash Wednesday, The Four Minute Mile, Matlock Police, MDA, Bellbird, Players to the Gallery, Loose Ends and Blue Heelers.

FILM

TELEVISION

STAGE

 God Bless Us Everyone (?)
 The Crucible (?)
 Our Town (?)
 Winnie The Pooh (1969) 
 The Rape Of Lucretica McColl (1971)
 Peter Pan (1972)
 Catholic Schoolgirls (1983;1985)
 Crystal Clear (1986)
 When I Was A Young Girl I Used To Scream (1987)
 The Department (1988)
 The Recruiting Officer (1991)
 The Removalists (1991)
 The Heidi Chronicles (1992)
 A Midsummer Night's Dream (1993;1995)
 Two Weeks With The Queen (1993-1994)
 After The Ball (2018)

Film
Mann's first starring role on the big screen was low budget drama Hard Knocks; she  won an AFI award for Best Actress in a Leading Role as a young ex prisoner being hassled by the police. She played sister to the main character in New Zealand film The Scarecrow (aka Klynham Summer), which was invited to play at the Cannes Film Festival. Mann has also appeared in the  Yahoo Serious movie Reckless Kelly, Hating Alison Ashley and Any Questions for Ben?.

Voice over work
Mann provided the voice of the Holophone in an episode of  children's science fiction series Silversun and Susie Sponge on the second season of popular animated series The Toothbrush Family. Her other voice acting roles include animated series Classic Tales, Kangaroo Creek Gang and Tracey McBean (both produced by Southern Star Entertainment).

Personal life
Mann has related her conversion to Buddhism:
"I was sort of unconsciously on a bit of a path... I was doing a show called 'Janus'... I just reached a point that my spirit, my consciousness, had said, "Tracy, enough, Now you have to get it... And I had five weeks off of filming 'Janus' and went to Nepal... to go to a monastery to study Buddhism."

References

External links
 

1957 births
Actresses from Adelaide
Australian film actresses
Australian television actresses
Australian voice actresses
Best Actress AACTA Award winners
Living people
Logie Award winners